Major Herbert James  (31 October 1887 – 15 August 1958) was an English recipient of the Victoria Cross, the highest and most prestigious award for gallantry in the face of the enemy that can be awarded to British and Commonwealth forces.

Herbert James was born at 11 Ingleby Street in Ladywood, Birmingham. He was the son of Walter James and Emily James (née Danford). By the 1891 Census his family were living at 76 Three Shires Oak Road in Bearwood, Smethwick. He attended Bearwood Road Infants School and later went on to become a teacher there, and subsequently at Brasshouse Lane School.

James was 26 years old and a second lieutenant in the 4th Battalion, The Worcestershire Regiment, British Army during the First World War when the following deed took place for which he was awarded the VC.

On 28 June 1915 in the southern zone of Gallipoli, when the advance of part of the regiment had been checked, Second-Lieutenant James, from a neighbouring unit, gathered together a body of men and led them forward under heavy fire. He then returned, organised a second party and again advanced, putting fresh life into the attack. On 3 July he headed a party of bomb throwers up a Turkish communication trench and when all his party had been killed or wounded, he remained alone, under murderous fire and kept back the enemy until a barrier had been built behind him and the trench secured.

James returned home, after his award of the VC and received Civic receptions in both Birmingham and Smethwick. His family address, as of his visit in November 1915, was 141 Poplar Avenue in Edgbaston, Birmingham.

He later achieved the rank of major. His medals are on display at the Maryborough Military and Colonial Museum in Maryborough, Queensland, Australia.

Two memorials to James were unveiled in 2010. on 2 July a memorial stone was unveiled at the East Chapel in Kensal Green Cemetery, where he was cremated. On 12 November a plaque was unveiled at Bearwood Road School. This was presented to the school by Smethwick Heritage Centre.

References

Monuments to Courage (David Harvey, 1999)
The Register of the Victoria Cross (This England, 1997)
VCs of the First World War - Gallipoli (Stephen Snelling, 1995)

External links
Smethwick Heritage Centre
VC to be sold at auction
VC sale
Location of grave and VC medal (Kensal Green Cemetery)

1880s births
1958 deaths
British Gallipoli campaign recipients of the Victoria Cross
Worcestershire Regiment officers
British Army personnel of World War I
Recipients of the Military Cross
People from Ladywood
Burials at Kensal Green Cemetery
East Lancashire Regiment officers
York and Lancaster Regiment officers
21st Lancers soldiers
Recipients of the Croix de Guerre 1914–1918 (France)
British Army recipients of the Victoria Cross
Military personnel from Birmingham, West Midlands